Dendrophilia taphronoma is a moth of the family Gelechiidae. It was described by Edward Meyrick in 1932. It is found in north-eastern India.

References

taphronoma
Moths described in 1932
Moths of Asia